Jeremy Graham Horn (born August 25, 1975) is an American mixed martial artist. Horn is best known for fighting in smaller American promotions, he has also competed in some of the premiere mixed martial arts organizations around the world, including the UFC, WEC, PRIDE, Bellator, Pancrase, the IFL, King of the Cage, and the International Fighting Championships (IFC). Horn is the former King of the Cage Light Heavyweight Champion and has also competed in the Heavyweight and Light Heavyweight divisions.

Background
Horn was born and raised in Omaha, Nebraska, and has two half-brothers, Sid and Matt Anderson, along with his younger brother Marshall Horn. All of the boys were raised by their single mother, Ruth. A belligerent child, he began training when he was 12 years old, along with his brother Matt. Before becoming a full-time mixed martial arts fighter, Horn worked in construction. He is known for his durability, with a total of 119 total fights in his career, as well as his grappling skills with 53 of his 91 wins by submission.

Mixed martial arts

Early career
Horn's early martial arts training was under Robert Bussey's Warrior International founder, Robert Bussey. Horn earned a RBWI black belt under Bussey in 1992, and spent most of his career with the Miletich Fighting Systems team in Iowa. Horn is currently training in Salt Lake City, Utah with Elite Performance, the team that he created.

Horn made his professional debut in early 1996 in a warehouse in Atlanta, Georgia. Horn won the bout in under two minutes via armbar submission, and would go on to reach a record of 9-2-3 with eight submission wins before being invited to compete in the UFC.

UFC
Horn made his UFC debut at UFC 17 on May 15, 1998 against then-UFC Light Heavyweight Champion, Frank Shamrock in a fight for the UFC Light Heavyweight Championship. Horn lost via kneebar submission 16:28 into the bout. He also fought Jason Godsey in the UFC.

Horn made his next appearance for the organization at UFC Brazil five fights later against Brazilian Vale Tudo fighter, Ebenezer Fontes Braga. Horn lost the bout via guillotine choke submission 3:27 into the first round. Horn bounced back after the loss, going 9-0-1 in his next 10 fights with two wins in the IFC and the draw being against Keiichiro Yamamiya in Horn's Pancrase debut. Horn returned to the UFC at UFC 19 to fight future UFC Light Heavyweight Champion and future UFC Hall of Fame inductee, Chuck Liddell. Horn rendered Liddell unconscious with an arm-triangle choke 12:00 into the bout, which would be the only submission loss of Liddell's career.

Horn compiled eight more wins to bring his winning-streak to 15 fights, before making another appearance for the UFC at UFC 21 against Daiju Takase in Cedar Rapids, Iowa. Horn won the bout via TKO 4:41 into the fight. Horn then fought at UFC 22 two fights later against Jason Godsey, who had defeated Horn via submission earlier in his career. 

His 18-fight winning-streak was snapped in his next fight after suffering a loss via majority decision at the hands of Hiromitsu Kanehara in Horn's RINGS debut in Tokyo, Japan. His next loss was against future Pride Heavyweight Champion and future UFC Interim Heavyweight Champion, Antônio Rodrigo Nogueira via unanimous decision. After a split decision loss to Ricardo Arona in RINGS, Horn made his next UFC appearance at UFC 27 against future Strikeforce U.S. Middleweight Champion Eugene Jackson and won via armbar submission in the first round.

In RINGS, Horn faced six-time UFC Champion and UFC Hall of Famer Randy Couture who was able to out strike Horn from the clinch and knocked down Horn multiple times, as Horn would end up losing in a unanimous decision. After the loss to Couture, Horn faced Australian Brazilian jiu-jitsu specialist, Elvis Sinosic at UFC 30. Sinosic, who held a career record 3-3-1 coming into the fight, defeated Horn with an armbar submission. Two fights after a majority decision loss in a rematch with Ricardo Arona, Horn was invited to compete in the Pride Fighting Championships.

PRIDE
Horn made his PRIDE debut against Akira Shoji on December 23, 2001, at Pride 18 in Fukuoka, Japan. Horn won the bout against the Japanese veteran via unanimous decision. Horn's next appearance for the Japan-based organization was against Gilbert Yvel at Pride 21 and Horn won via unanimous decision.

WEC, King of the Cage, and the IFC
After his last fight with PRIDE, Horn made his WEC debut at WEC 4 and won via rear-naked choke submission under one minute into the first round. Horn then followed this up with wins over Kristof Midoux, Travis Fulton, Chalid Arrab, and Homer Moore before fighting for the King of the Cage Light Heavyweight Championship against then-champion, Vernon White, who had won and defended the title four times. Horn won the bout via unanimous decision, becoming the new King of the Cage Light Heavyweight Champion.

Two fights later, Horn fought in the IFC Light Heavyweight tournament on September 6, 2003, and won his first bout of the night via armbar submission before facing future Ultimate Fighter Winner, UFC Light Heavyweight Champion, and UFC Hall of Famer, Forrest Griffin in a highly anticipated bout. The two exchanged powerful strikes on the feet and battled on the ground in the first round, and continued to grapple through the second round until Horn knocked out the fatigued Griffin with a single head kick. Horn's next fight of the night was for the final against future Strikeforce Light Heavyweight Champion Renato "Babalu" Sobral. Sobral was able to overwhelm Horn from the start of the fight with his strikes and grappling skills as he took down Horn who then attempted a triangle choke before Sobral escaped from the position. Later in the round, Horn took down Sobral, who in turn was able to get back on top of Horn and continue to utilize the ground and pound technique while again Horn came very close to executing a successful triangle choke which he held until the end of the round. At the start of the second round, the two exchanged submission attempts until Horn, while ground and pounding Sobral from the top, unintentionally landed an illegal knee strike to the face of the downed Muay Thai fighter. After the fight continued, Sobral took down Horn and the two continued to battle from the ground until the end of the fight. Horn ultimately lost in a unanimous decision in a very entertaining fight.

Two fights later, Horn defended his King of the Cage Light Heavyweight Championship title against former King of the Cage Middleweight Champion, who had vacated his title when he moved up to the Light Heavyweight division. Two fights later, Horn fought for TKO Major League MMA against UFC veteran, David Losieau and won via guillotine choke submission under one minute into the first round. Horn then fought against future UFC veteran Chael Sonnen and won via TKO due to a cut 3:34 into the fight. Two fights after the win over Sonnen, Horn fought future longtime UFC Middleweight Champion, Anderson Silva in Seoul, South Korea. Horn was outmatched by Silva's striking and multiple takedown attempts by Horn were defended by the Brazilian fighter using the sprawl technique, as Horn would go on to lose in a unanimous decision.

Two fights later, Horn had a rematch with Chael Sonnen. Sonnen, a wrestler, immediately took Horn down and utilized the ground and pound technique through the first round and into the second round until Horn was able to sink in a guillotine choke, causing Sonnen to tap. Horn faced Josh Burkman two fights after the win over Sonnen, and won via technical submission with a guillotine choke early into the fight, causing controversy as he spit on the downed Burkman immediately after the referee stopped the fight. After following this up with another win, Horn returned to the UFC.

Return to the UFC
Horn made his return to the UFC at UFC 54 to fight for the UFC Light Heavyweight Championship against then-champion, Chuck Liddell in a rematch of their UFC 19 bout. Horn lost the rematch via TKO, after being dominated by Liddell's superior striking, although Horn displayed his toughness and heart, as the fight carried on until 2:46 into the fourth round. Horn made his next appearance at UFC 56 against South African Trevor Prangley and won via unanimous decision. After his win over Prangley, Horn fought Chael Sonnen for a third time at UFC 60 and won again, this time being via armbar submission.

At a September 9, 2006, International Fight League show, Horn lost to former Olympic wrestling silver medalist Matt Lindland in the second round due to strikes. After the fight, Horn announced that he would be taking a break from fighting. He returned from this break when he beat Falaniko Vitale by split decision at the IFL Oakland event. Horn's next bout, the 100th of his career, was a loss against future Strikeforce Middleweight Grand Prix Champion Jorge Santiago, but then won his next bout via unanimous decision against future Ultimate Fighter winner and current UFC veteran, Court McGee, who had been undefeated heading into the fight.

Horn then fought again for the UFC at UFC 81 against future Strikeforce Welterweight Champion Nate Marquardt as a replacement for Thales Leites and lost via guillotine choke submission. Horn then lost again via guillotine choke submission in a rematch with Dean Lister at The Ultimate Fighter: Team Rampage vs Team Forrest Finale. After two consecutive losses, Horn faced Brazilian jiu-jitsu specialist Rousimar Palhares at UFC 93 in Dublin, Ireland and lost again via unanimous decision. After three consecutive losses, Horn was released by the UFC.

Post-UFC
After leaving the UFC, Horn then fought Sean Salmon and defeated him in the first round by rear-naked choke to win the IFC Middleweight Championship. Horn fought for the Bellator Fighting Championships against Bryan Baker at Bellator 30 on September 23, 2010. Horn lost the bout via unanimous decision.

Horn was set to face UFC and WEC veteran Jake Rosholt on April 16, 2010, on the "Bad Boys 2" card for King of the Cage, but the fight was canceled when Rosholt sustained a neck injury the day before the event.

Championships and accomplishments

Mixed martial arts
Elite 1 MMA
Elite 1 MMA Light Heavyweight Championship (One time)
5150 Combat League
5150 Combat League Middleweight Championship (One time)
Fighting Network RINGS
2000 Rising Stars Middleweight Tournament Winner
International Fighting Championships
IFC Middleweight Championship (One time)
King of the Cage
King of the Cage Light Heavyweight Champion (One time)
IFC
IFC Light Heavyweight Tournament Finalist
Sugar Creek Showdown
SCS Light Heavyweight Championship (One time)
TKO/UCC
TKO Simultaneous Two Division Champion
TKO World Light Heavyweight Championship (One time)
TKO World Middleweight Championship (One time)

Mixed martial arts record

|-
| Win
| align=center| 92–22–5 (1)
| Mike Khardas
| TKO (submission to head kick)
| Extreme Challenge 239
| 
| align=center| 1
| align=center| 1:47
| Jefferson, Iowa, United States
|
|-
| Loss
| align=center| 91–22–5 (1)
|Egidijus Valavicius
| Submission (leg injury)
| SCS 28: Shockwave
| 
| align=center| 1
| align=center| 0:56
| Hinton, Oklahoma, United States
| 
|-
| NC
| align=center| 91–21–5 (1)
| Tony Lopez
| NC (overturned by commission)
| SCS 25: Apocalypse
| 
| align=center| 5
| align=center| 5:00
| Hinton, Oklahoma, United States
| 
|-
| Win
| align=center| 91–21–5
| Brian Imes
| Submission (kimura)
| SCS 22: Reborn
| 
| align=center| 1
| align=center| 1:15
| Hinton, Oklahoma, United States
| 
|-
| Win
| align=center| 90–21–5
| Dan McGlasson
| Submission (rear-naked choke)
| APFC 16
| 
| align=center| 1
| align=center| 3:45
| Villa Park, Illinois, United States
|
|-
| Win
| align=center| 89–21–5
| Brad Scholten
| Submission (rear-naked choke)
| Extreme Challenge 200
| 
| align=center| 1
| align=center| 2:26
| Council Bluffs, Iowa, United States
|
|-
| Win
| align=center| 88–21–5
| Shawn Marchand
| Submission (rear-naked choke)
| Elite 1 MMA: Hostile Territory
| 
| align=center| 1
| align=center| 2:18
| Moncton, New Brunswick, Canada
|  
|-
| Loss
| align=center| 87–21–5
| Thales Leites
| Decision (split)
| Superior Challenge 7
| 
| align=center| 3
| align=center| 5:00
| Stockholm, Sweden
|  
|-
| Win
| align=center| 87–20–5
| Lee McKibbin
| Submission (guillotine choke)
| Cage Wars - Validation
| 
| align=center| 1
| align=center| 3:40
| Belfast, Northern Ireland
| 
|-
| Loss
| align=center| 86–20–5
| Bryan Baker
| Decision (unanimous)
| Bellator 30
| 
| align=center| 3
| align=center| 5:00
| Louisville, Kentucky, United States
| 
|-
| Win
| align=center| 86–19–5
| Brian Warren
| Submission (arm-triangle choke)
| UFO: Rumble at the Races
| 
| align=center| 1
| align=center| 3:09
| Kennewick, Washington, United States
| 
|-
| Win
| align=center| 85–19–5
| Sean Salmon
| Submission (rear-naked choke)
| IFC: Extreme Challenge
| 
| align=center| 1
| align=center| 1:57
| Mt. Pleasant, Michigan, United States
|  
|-
| Win
| align=center| 84–19–5
| Victor Moreno
| Submission (rear-naked choke)
| 5150 Combat League/XFL "New Year's Revolution"
| 
| align=center| 1
| align=center| 2:37
| Tulsa, Oklahoma, United States
|  
|-
| Win
| align=center| 83–19–5
| Joe Trujillo
| Submission (keylock)
| Rocky Mountain Nationals: Stars of MMA
| 
| align=center| 1
| align=center| 2:52
| Denver, Colorado, United States
| 
|-
| Win
| align=center| 82–19–5
| Jason Guida
| Technical Submission (arm-triangle choke)
| Arena Rumble: Guida vs. Horn
| 
| align=center| 1
| align=center| 4:03
| Spokane, Washington, United States
| 
|-
| Win
| align=center| 81–19–5
| Chris Davis
| Submission (rear-naked choke)
| Adrenaline MMA 3: Bragging Rights
| 
| align=center| 1
| align=center| 4:17
| Birmingham, Alabama, United States
| 
|-
| Loss
| align=center| 80–19–5
| Rousimar Palhares
| Decision (unanimous)
| UFC 93
| 
| align=center| 3
| align=center| 5:00
| Dublin, Ireland
| 
|-
| Loss
| align=center| 80–18–5
| Dean Lister
| Submission (guillotine choke)
| The Ultimate Fighter: Team Rampage vs Team Forrest Finale
| 
| align=center| 1
| align=center| 3:52
| Las Vegas, Nevada, United States
| 
|-
| Loss
| align=center| 80–17–5
| Nate Marquardt
| Submission (guillotine choke)
| UFC 81
| 
| align=center| 2
| align=center| 1:37
| Las Vegas, Nevada, United States
| 
|-
| Win
| align=center| 80–16–5
| Court McGee
| Decision (unanimous)
| Ultimate Combat Experience: Utah
| 
| align=center| 3
| align=center| 5:00
| Salt Lake City, Utah, United States
| 
|-
| Loss
| align=center| 79–16–5
| Jorge Santiago
| Submission (triangle choke)
| Art of War 3
| 
| align=center| 1
| align=center| 3:02
| Dallas, Texas, United States
| 
|-
| Win
| align=center| 79–15–5
| Falaniko Vitale
| Decision (split)
| International Fight League: Oakland
| 
| align=center| 5
| align=center| 4:00
| Oakland, California, United States
|-
| Loss
| align=center| 78–15–5
| Matt Lindland
| TKO (punches)
| International Fight League: Portland
| 
| align=center| 2
| align=center| 0:21
| Portland, Oregon, United States
| 
|-
| Win
| align=center| 78–14–5
| Chael Sonnen
| Submission (armbar)
| UFC 60: Hughes vs. Gracie
| 
| align=center| 2
| align=center| 1:17
| Los Angeles, California, United States
| 
|-
| Win
| align=center| 77–14–5
| Trevor Prangley
| Decision (unanimous)
| UFC 56
| 
| align=center| 3
| align=center| 5:00
| Las Vegas, Nevada, United States
| 
|-
| Loss
| align=center| 76–14–5
| Chuck Liddell
| TKO (retirement)
| UFC 54
| 
| align=center| 4
| align=center| 2:46
| Las Vegas, Nevada, United States
|  
|-
| Win
| align=center| 76–13–5
| Spencer Canup
| KO (punches)
| IFC: Caged Combat
| 
| align=center| 1
| align=center| 3:36
| Columbus, Ohio, United States
| 
|-
| Win
| align=center| 75–13–5
| Josh Burkman
| Technical Submission (guillotine choke)
| XFC: Dome of Destruction 1
| 
| align=center| 1
| align=center| 1:14
| Tacoma, Washington, United States
| 
|-
| Win
| align=center| 74–13–5
| William Hill
| Submission (guillotine choke)
| Extreme Challenge 61
| 
| align=center| 2
| align=center| 2:45
| Osceola, Iowa, United States
| 
|-
| Win
| align=center| 73–13–5
| Kazuki Okubo
| KO (punch to the body)
| Euphoria: USA vs World
| 
| align=center| 1
| align=center| 3:19
| Atlantic City, New Jersey, United States
| 
|-
| Win
| align=center| 72–13–5
| Chael Sonnen
| Submission (guillotine choke)
| SF 6: Battleground in Reno
| 
| align=center| 2
| align=center| 2:35
| Reno, Nevada, United States
| 
|-
| Win
| align=center| 71–13–5
| Kyle Seals
| TKO (knee)
| Alaska Fighting Championship
| 
| align=center| 1
| align=center| N/A
| Anchorage, Alaska, United States
| 
|-
| Loss
| align=center| 70–13–5
| Anderson Silva
| Decision (unanimous)
| Gladiator FC: Day 2
| 
| align=center| 3
| align=center| 5:00
| Seoul, South Korea
| 
|-
| Win
| align=center| 70–12–5
| Cameron Brown
| Submission (arm-triangle choke)
| PXC 2: Chaos
| 
| align=center| 1
| align=center| 3:05
| Guam
| 
|-
| Win
| align=center| 69–12–5
| Chael Sonnen
| TKO (cut)
| Extreme Challenge 57
| 
| align=center| 1
| align=center| 3:34
| Council Bluffs, Iowa, United States
| 
|-
| Win
| align=center| 68–12–5
| David Loiseau
| Submission (guillotine choke)
| TKO Major League MMA
| 
| align=center| 1
| align=center| 0:54
| Montreal, Quebec, Canada
| 
|-
| Win
| align=center| 67–12–5
| Ron Fields
| TKO (punches)
| ICE 7: Meltdown at Metropolis
| 
| align=center| 2
| align=center| 3:01
| Fairfield, Ohio, United States
| 
|-
| Win
| align=center| 66–12–5
| Dean Lister
| Decision (majority)
| KOTC 31: King of the Cage 31
| 
| align=center| 4
| align=center| 5:00
| San Diego, California, United States
|  
|-
| Draw
| align=center| 65–12–5
| James Zikic
| Draw
| Extreme Brawl 4
| 
| align=center| 3
| align=center| 5:00
| Bracknell, England
| 
|-
| Loss
| align=center| 65–12–4
| Renato Sobral
| Decision (unanimous)
| IFC: Global Domination
| 
| align=center| 3
| align=center| 5:00
| Denver, Colorado, United States
|  
|-
| Win
| align=center| 65–11–4
| Forrest Griffin
| KO (head kick)
| IFC: Global Domination
| 
| align=center| 2
| align=center| 3:40
| Denver, Colorado, United States
|  
|-
| Win
| align=center| 64–11–4
| Mikhail Avetisyan
| Submission (armbar)
| IFC: Global Domination
| 
| align=center| 1
| align=center| 4:59
| Denver, Colorado, United States
|  
|-
| Win
| align=center| 63–11–4
| William Hill
| Submission (rear-naked choke)
| Extreme Challenge 51
| 
| align=center| 1
| align=center| 4:47
| St. Charles, Illinois, United States
| 
|-
| Win
| align=center| 62–11–4
| Vernon White
| Decision (unanimous)
| KOTC 23: Sin City
| 
| align=center| 5
| align=center| 5:00
| Las Vegas, Nevada, United States
|  
|-
| Win
| align=center| 61–11–4
| Homer Moore
| Decision (unanimous)
| ICC 2: Rebellion
| 
| align=center| 3
| align=center| 5:00
| Minneapolis, Minnesota, United States
| 
|-
| Win
| align=center| 60–11–4
| Chalid Arrab
| Decision (unanimous)
| 2H2H 6: Simply the Best
| 
| align=center| 1
| align=center| 15:00
| Rotterdam, the Netherlands
| 
|-
| Win
| align=center| 59–11–4
| Travis Fulton
| TKO (corner stoppage)
| ICC 1: Retribution
| 
| align=center| 2
| align=center| 0:50
| Minneapolis, Minnesota, United States
| 
|-
| Win
| align=center| 58–11–4
| Kristof Midoux
| Submission (arm-triangle choke)
| UCC 11: The Next Level
| 
| align=center| 2
| align=center| 1:02
| Montreal, Quebec, Canada
| 
|-
| Win
| align=center| 57–11–4
| Aaron Brink
| Submission (rear-naked choke)
| WEC 4
| 
| align=center| 1
| align=center| 0:54
| Uncasville, Connecticut, United States
| 
|-
| Win
| align=center| 56–11–4
| Gilbert Yvel
| Decision (unanimous)
| Pride 21
| 
| align=center| 3
| align=center| 5:00
| Saitama, Saitama
| 
|-
| Win
| align=center| 55–11–4
| Steve Funn
| Submission (armbar)
| Ultimate Cage Fighting 1
| 
| align=center| 1
| align=center| 0:13
| Los Angeles, California, United States
| 
|-
| Win
| align=center| 54–11–4
| Greg Wikan
| Submission (rear-naked choke)
| UW: Horn vs. Wikan
| 
| align=center| 2
| align=center| 4:40
| Minnesota, United States
| 
|-
| Win
| align=center| 53–11–4
| Stephan Potvin
| KO (slam)
| UCC 7: Bad Boyz
| 
| align=center| 1
| align=center| 0:35
| Montreal, Quebec, Canada
| 
|-
| Win
| align=center| 52–11–4
| Akira Shoji
| Decision (unanimous)
| Pride 18
| 
| align=center| 3
| align=center| 5:00
| Fukuoka, Fukuoka
| 
|-
| Win
| align=center| 51–11–4
| Dan Theodore
| KO (knee)
| Ultimate Wrestling Minnesota
| 
| align=center| 2
| align=center| 1:41
| Minnesota, United States
| 
|-
| Loss
| align=center| 50–11–4
| Ricardo Arona
| Decision (majority)
| Rings: 10th Anniversary
| 
| align=center| 2
| align=center| 5:00
| Tokyo, Japan
| 
|-
| Win
| align=center| 50–10–4
| Shawn Wagner
| Submission (rear-naked choke)
| Mass Destruction 3
| 
| align=center| 1
| align=center| 2:35
| Springfield, Massachusetts, United States
| 
|-
| Win
| align=center| 49–10–4
| Demetrius Worlds
| Submission (rear-naked choke)
| Gladiators 16
| 
| align=center| 1
| align=center| N/A
| Des Moines, Iowa, United States
| 
|-
| Win
| align=center| 48–10–4
| Brad Krane
| TKO (Submission to punches)
| Gladiators 14
| 
| align=center| 1
| align=center| N/A
| Omaha, Nebraska, United States
| 
|-
| Win
| align=center| 47–10–4
| Iouri Bekichev
| Submission (arm-triangle choke)
| Rings: World Title Series 1
| 
| align=center| 1
| align=center| 0:50
| Tokyo, Japan
| 
|-
| Win
| align=center| 46–10–4
| Griffen Reynaud
| TKO (Submission to punches)
| Rings USA: Battle of Champions
| 
| align=center| 1
| align=center| 2:55
| Council Bluffs, Iowa, United States
| 
|-
| Loss
| align=center| 45–10–4
| Elvis Sinosic
| Submission (triangle armbar)
| UFC 30
| 
| align=center| 1
| align=center| 2:59
| Atlantic City, New Jersey, United States
| 
|-
| Loss
| align=center| 45–9–4
| Randy Couture
| Decision (unanimous)
| Rings: King of Kings 2000 Block A
| 
| align=center| 3
| align=center| 5:00
| Tokyo, Japan
| 
|-
| Win
| align=center| 45–8–4
| Chris Haseman
| Submission (armbar)
| Rings USA: Rising Stars Final
| 
| align=center| 1
| align=center| 2:36
| Moline, Illinois, United States
| 
|-
| Win
| align=center| 44–8–4
| Josh Hall
| Submission (kneebar)
| Rings USA: Rising Stars Final
| 
| align=center| 1
| align=center| 3:50
| Moline, Illinois, United States
| 
|-
| Win
| align=center| 43–8–4
| Eugene Jackson
| Submission (armbar)
| UFC 27
| 
| align=center| 1
| align=center| 4:32
| New Orleans, Louisiana, United States
| 
|-
| Loss
| align=center| 42–8–4
| Ricardo Arona
| Decision (split)
| Rings: Millennium Combine 3
| 
| align=center| 2
| align=center| 5:00
| Osaka, Japan
| 
|-
| Win
| align=center| 42–7–4
| Keith Mielke
| KO (punches)
| Rings USA: Rising Stars Block A
| 
| align=center| 1
| align=center| 1:47
| Orem, Utah, United States
| 
|-
| Win
| align=center| 41–7–4
| Jason Allar
| KO (head kick)
| Extreme Challenge 35
| 
| align=center| 2
| align=center| 1:03
| Davenport, Iowa, United States
| 
|-
| Win
| align=center| 40–7–4
| Nate Parmelee
| KO (elbow)
| Extreme Challenge 33
| 
| align=center| 1
| align=center| 3:24
| Council Bluffs, Iowa, United States
| 
|-
| Loss
| align=center| 39–7–4
| Kiyoshi Tamura
| Decision (unanimous)
| Colosseum 2000
| 
| align=center| 2
| align=center| 5:00
| Japan
| 
|-
| Win
| align=center| 39–6–4
| Yoshihisa Yamamoto
| Submission (arm-triangle choke)
| Rings: Millennium Combine 1
| 
| align=center| 2
| align=center| 2:50
| Tokyo, Japan
| 
|-
| Win
| align=center| 38–6–4
| George Randolph
| Submission (arm-triangle choke)
| SFC: Xplosion!
| 
| align=center| 1
| align=center| 3:32
| Belleville, Illinois, United States
| 
|-
| Loss
| align=center| 37–6–4
| Antônio Rodrigo Nogueira
| Decision (unanimous)
| WEF 8: Goin' Platinum
| 
| align=center| 3
| align=center| 8:00
| Rome, Georgia, United States
| 
|-
| Win
| align=center| 37–5–4
| Aaron Pendleton
| TKO (Submission to punches)
| Extreme Challenge 30
| 
| align=center| 1
| align=center| 3:25
| Council Bluffs, Iowa, United States
| 
|-
| Win
| align=center| 36–5–4
| John Marsh
| Decision (unanimous)
| Neutral Grounds 13
| 
| align=center| 3
| align=center| 5:00
| Lakeside, California, United States
| 
|-
| Win
| align=center| 35–5–4
| Johnathan Ivey
| TKO (injury)
| HOOKnSHOOT: Millennium
| 
| align=center| 1
| align=center| 1:24
| Evansville, Indiana, United States
| 
|-
| Loss
| align=center| 34–5–4
| Hiromitsu Kanehara
| Decision (majority)
| Rings: King of Kings 1999 Block A
| 
| align=center| 2
| align=center| 5:00
| Tokyo, Japan
| 
|-
| Win
| align=center| 34–4–4
| Jason Godsey
| Submission (armbar)
| UFC 22
| 
| align=center| 1
| align=center| 2:08
| Lake Charles, Louisiana, United States
| 
|-
| Win
| align=center| 33–4–4
| Adam Harris
| TKO (punches)
| Extreme Challenge 27
| 
| align=center| 1
| align=center| 2:31
| Davenport, Iowa, United States
| 
|-
| Win
| align=center| 32–4–4
| Daiju Takase
| TKO (punches)
| UFC 21
| 
| align=center| 1
| align=center| 4:41
| Cedar Rapids, Iowa, United States
| 
|-
| Win
| align=center| 31–4–4
| Scott Ventimiglia
| Submission (armbar)
| HOOKnSHOOT: Ultimate Wrestle!
| 
| align=center| 1
| align=center| N/A
| Evansville, Indiana, United States
| 
|-
| Win
| align=center| 30–4–4
| Kristian Rothaermel
| Submission (rear-naked choke)
| Extreme Challenge 25
| 
| align=center| 1
| align=center| 2:31
| Council Bluffs, Iowa, United States
| 
|-
| Win
| align=center| 29–4–4
| Justin Ellison
| TKO (Submission to palm strikes)
| Extreme Challenge 24
| 
| align=center| 1
| align=center| 2:30
| Salt Lake City, Utah, United States
| 
|-
| Win
| align=center| 28–4–4
| Jim Theobald
| Submission (rear-naked choke)
| Submission Fighting Championships
| 
| align=center| 1
| align=center| N/A
| O'Fallon, Illinois, United States
| 
|-
| Win
| align=center| 27–4–4
| Mike Delaney
| TKO (Submission to punches)
| Freestyle Combat Challenge 1
| 
| align=center| 1
| align=center| 8:05
| Racine, Wisconsin, United States
| 
|-
| Win
| align=center| 26–4–4
| Todd Butler
| Submission (armbar)
| IFC: Fighters Revenge
| 
| align=center| 1
| align=center| 2:22
| Kahnawake, Quebec, Canada
| 
|-
| Win
| align=center| 25–4–4
| Jammy Daniels
| TKO (Submission to punches)
| Extreme Boxing 3
| 
| align=center| 1
| align=center| 2:47
| Davenport, Iowa, United States
| 
|-
| Win
| align=center| 24–4–4
| Brandon Wilson
| Submission (rear-naked choke)
| Gladiators 2
| 
| align=center| 1
| align=center| 1:40
| Sioux City, Iowa, United States
| 
|-
| Win
| align=center| 23–4–4
| Chuck Liddell
| Technical Submission (inverted arm-triangle choke)
| UFC 19
| 
| align=center| 1
| align=center| 12:00
| Bay St. Louis, Mississippi, United States
| 
|-
| Win
| align=center| 22–4–4
| Steve Berger
| Decision (unanimous)
| Submission Fighting Championships
| 
| align=center| 1
| align=center| 24:00
| Belleville, Illinois, United States
| 
|-
| Win
| align=center| 21–4–4
| Ken Parr
| Submission (rear-naked choke)
| HOOKnSHOOT: Trial
| 
| align=center| 1
| align=center| 3:23
| Evansville, Indiana, United States
| 
|-
| Win
| align=center| 20–4–4
| Mark Walker
| Submission (arm-triangle choke)
| Extreme Boxing 1
| 
| align=center| 1
| align=center| 2:29
| Davenport, Iowa, United States
| 
|-
| Win
| align=center| 19–4–4
| John Dixson
| Submission (armbar)
| IFC: Extreme Combat
| 
| align=center| 1
| align=center| 0:57
| Montreal, Quebec, Canada
| 
|-
| Win
| align=center| 18–4–4
| Rene Tremblay
| Submission (triangle choke)
| IFC: Extreme Combat
| 
| align=center| 1
| align=center| 1:01
| Montreal, Quebec, Canada
| 
|-
| Win
| align=center| 17–4–4
| Nick Starks
| Submission (arm-triangle choke)
| New Year's Eve Knockout 1
| 
| align=center| 1
| align=center| 5:21
| Atlanta, Georgia, United States
| 
|-
| Draw
| align=center| 16–4–4
| Keiichiro Yamamiya
| Draw
| Pancrase: Advance 12
| 
| align=center| 1
| align=center| 15:00
| Chiba, Chiba
| 
|-
| Win
| align=center| 16–4–3
| Rich Nettleton
| Submission (rear-naked choke)
| Gladiators 1
| 
| align=center| 1
| align=center| 1:44
| Sioux City, Iowa, United States
| 
|-
| Win
| align=center| 15–4–3
| Jerome Smith
| Submission (armbar)
| HOOKnSHOOT: Eruption
| 
| align=center| 1
| align=center| 4:02
| Evansville, Indiana, United States
| 
|-
| Win
| align=center| 14–4–3
| Derrick Ruffin
| Submission (rear-naked choke)
| Submission Fighting Championships
| 
| align=center| 1
| align=center| 3:49
| Carbondale, Illinois, United States
| 
|-
| Loss
| align=center| 13–4–3
| Ebenezer Fontes Braga
| Submission (guillotine choke)
| UFC Brazil
| 
| align=center| 1
| align=center| 3:27
| Sao Paulo, Brazil
| 
|-
| Win
| align=center| 13–3–3
| Wayne Pittman
| Submission (rear-naked choke)
| Midwest Fighting 2
| 
| align=center| 1
| align=center| 1:40
| United States
| 
|-
| Win
| align=center| 12–3–3
| Clayton Miller
| TKO (punches)
| Midwest Fighting 2
| 
| align=center| 1
| align=center| 3:27
| United States
| 
|-
| Win
| align=center| 11–3–3
| Todd Butler
| Submission (rear-naked choke)
| Extreme Challenge 20
| 
| align=center| 1
| align=center| 3:28
| Davenport, Iowa, United States
| 
|-
| Win
| align=center| 10–3–3
| Jaymon Hotz
| TKO (Submission to punches)
| Midwest Fighting 1
| 
| align=center| 1
| align=center| 1:56
| Broomfield, Colorado, United States
| 
|-
| Loss
| align=center| 9–3–3
| Frank Shamrock
| Submission (kneebar)
| UFC 17
| 
| align=center| 1
| align=center| 16:28
| Mobile, Alabama, United States
|  
|-
| Draw
| align=center| 9–2–3
| Travis Fulton
| Draw
| Extreme Challenge 16
| 
| align=center| 1
| align=center| 20:00
| Council Bluffs, Iowa, United States
| 
|-
| Win
| align=center| 9–2–2
| Noe Hernandez
| Decision (unanimous)
| Extreme Challenge 15
| 
| align=center| 1
| align=center| 15:00
| Muncie, Indiana, United States
| 
|-
| Win
| align=center| 8–2–2
| Pat Assalone
| Submission (armbar)
| Extreme Challenge 15
| 
| align=center| 1
| align=center| 1:38
| Muncie, Indiana, United States
| 
|-
| Draw
| align=center| 7–2–2
| Travis Fulton
| Draw
| Extreme Challenge 9
| 
| align=center| 1
| align=center| 15:00
| Davenport, Iowa, United States
| 
|-
| Draw
| align=center| 7–2–1
| Dan Severn
| Draw
| Extreme Challenge 7
| 
| align=center| 1
| align=center| 20:00
| Council Bluffs, Iowa, United States
| 
|-
| Loss
| align=center| 7–2
| Jason Godsey
| Submission (rear-naked choke)
| Extreme Challenge 6
| 
| align=center| 1
| align=center| 6:42
| Battle Creek, Michigan, United States
| 
|-
| Win
| align=center| 7–1
| Steven Goss
| Submission (triangle choke)
| Extreme Challenge 6
| 
| align=center| 1
| align=center| 4:16
| Battle Creek, Michigan, United States
| 
|-
| Win
| align=center| 6–1
| Dennis Reed
| Submission (armbar)
| Extreme Challenge 4
| 
| align=center| 1
| align=center| 7:55
| Council Bluffs, Iowa, United States
| 
|-
| Win
| align=center| 5–1
| Gary Myers
| Submission (armbar)
| Extreme Challenge 1
| 
| align=center| 1
| align=center| 2:06
| Des Moines, Iowa, United States
| 
|-
| Win
| align=center| 4–1
| Nate Schroeder
| Submission (rear-naked choke)
| Brawl at the Ballpark 1
| 
| align=center| 1
| align=center| 4:50
| Davenport, Iowa, United States
| 
|-
| Win
| align=center| 3–1
| Nate Schroeder
| TKO (Submission to punches)
| Gladiators 1
| 
| align=center| 1
| align=center| 7:44
| Davenport, Iowa, United States
| 
|-
| Loss
| align=center| 2–1
| Mark Hanssen
| Submission (armbar)
| Quad City Ultimate 2
| 
| align=center| 1
| align=center| 9:10
| Moline, Illinois, United States
| 
|-
| Win
| align=center| 2–0
| Mike Adsit
| TKO (Submission to elbows)
| Quad City Ultimate 2
| 
| align=center| 1
| align=center| 2:00
| Moline, Illinois, United States
| 
|-
| Win
| align=center| 1–0
| Rick Graveson
| Submission (armbar)
| Atlanta Fights
| 
| align=center| 1
| align=center| 1:54
| Atlanta, Georgia, United States
|

Professional boxing record

References

External links
 
 
 MiddleEasy.com Interview

1975 births
American male mixed martial artists
Mixed martial artists from Nebraska
Middleweight mixed martial artists
Light heavyweight mixed martial artists
Mixed martial artists utilizing boxing
Ultimate Fighting Championship male fighters
Living people
American male boxers
Sportspeople from Omaha, Nebraska